Grabowiec (German Grabowitz, 1939-1945 Hainbusch)  is a village in the administrative district of Gmina Lubicz, within Toruń County, Kuyavian-Pomeranian Voivodeship, in north-central Poland. The village has a population of 570.

In April 2005, one of its streets was named Obi-Wan Kenobi Street (Polish: ulica Obi-Wana Kenobiego) after the famous Jedi master from Star Wars movies.

References

Villages in Toruń County